United States v. Mitchell may refer to the following legal cases:

United States v. Mitchell I (1795), 2 U.S. (2 Dall.) 348 (1795)
United States v. Mitchell II (1795), 2 U.S. (2 Dall.) 357 (1795)
United States v. Mitchell (1883), 109 U.S. 146 (1883)
United States v. Mitchell (1907), 205 U.S. 161 (1907)
United States v. Mitchell (1926), 271 U.S. 9 (1926)
United States v. Mitchell (1944), 322 U.S. 65 (1944)
United States v. Mitchell (1971), 403 U.S. 190 (1971)
United States v. Mitchell (1980), 445 U.S. 535 (1980)
United States v. Mitchell (1983), 463 U.S. 206 (1983)